Kearney Township is an inactive township in Clay County, in the U.S. state of Missouri.

Kearney Township was erected in 1872, taking its name from Kearney, Missouri.

References

Townships in Missouri
Townships in Clay County, Missouri